KSC may refer to:

Karlsruher SC, a German association football club, based in Karlsruhe, Baden-Württemberg
Keene State College, New Hampshire, US
Kelsey-Seybold Clinic, Houston, US, NASA-affiliated
Kennedy Space Center, Cape Canaveral, Florida, US
Kenya Social Congress
Kilogram-force per square centimetre
Knights of Saint Columba, a UK Catholic lay society
Knights of the Southern Cross, an Australian Catholic lay society
Košice International Airport, Košice, Slovakia, IATA airport code
Kurtis Sport Car, US
Communist Party of Czechoslovakia (Czech and Slovak: Komunistická strana Československa, KSČ), 1921-1992